VA-135 was an Attack Squadron of the U.S. Navy, nicknamed Uninvited. It was established as Torpedo Squadron VT-81 on 1 March 1944, redesignated VA-14A on 15 November 1946, and finally designated VA-135 on 2 August 1948. The squadron was disestablished on 30 November 1949. A second squadron bore the VA-135 designation in 1961-1962; the squadrons were not related.

Operational history

14 November 1944: The squadron’s first combat strike was conducted against Manila Harbor.
9–20 January 1945: The squadron was part of a task force that entered the South China Sea and conducted combat operations against Cam Ranh Bay; Hong Kong and Takao Harbor, Formosa.
16 February 1945: The squadron struck the home islands of Japan, flying a seven-plane attack against Hamamatuo Airfield on Honshu.
21 February 1945: The squadron participated in its first ground support mission, flying sorties over Iwo Jima.
1 March 1945: The squadron flew its last combat strike of the war. During the four months of combat operations from  it did not lose any personnel due to enemy action (two personnel were lost due to operational accidents).

Home port assignments
The squadron was assigned to these home ports, effective on the dates shown:

 Naval Air Station Quonset Point – 01 Mar 1944
 Naval Auxiliary Air Field Martha's Vineyard – 01 Mar 1944*
 Naval Auxiliary Air Field Boca Chica – 20 Apr 1944*
 Naval Auxiliary Air Field Otis – 10 May 1944*
 Naval Air Station San Diego – 10 Aug 1944*
 Naval Air Station Puʻunene – 01 Sep 1944*
 Naval Air Station Pasco – 13 May 1945*
 Naval Auxiliary Air Field Sanford – 31 Jul 1945*
 Naval Air Station Quonset Point – 15 Sep 1945
 Naval Air Station San Diego – Jun 1946
 Naval Air Station Jacksonville – 01 Apr 1949
* Temporary shore assignment while the squadron conducted training in preparation for combat deployment.

Aircraft assignment
The squadron first received the following aircraft on the dates shown:
 TBF-1C Avenger – Mar 1944
 TBM-1 Avenger – Mar 1944
 TBF-1 Avenger – Mar 1944
 TBF-1C Avenger – Nov 1944
 TBM-1D Avenger – Nov 1944
 TBM-3 Avenger – May 1945
 TBM-3E Avenger – May 1945
 TBM-3Q Avenger – 1946
 AD-4 Skyraider – Sep 1949

See also

 List of squadrons in the Dictionary of American Naval Aviation Squadrons
 Second VA-135 (U.S. Navy)
 Attack aircraft
 List of inactive United States Navy aircraft squadrons
 History of the United States Navy

References

External links

Attack squadrons of the United States Navy
Wikipedia articles incorporating text from the Dictionary of American Naval Aviation Squadrons